Richwood is a city in Brazoria County, Texas, United States. The population was 4,781 at the 2020 census.

Geography

Richwood is located in south-central Brazoria County at  (29.061512, –95.412597). It is bordered to the southwest by Oyster Creek, which separates it from the cities of Lake Jackson and Clute. The city extends to the northeast along Bastrop Bayou.

Demographics

As of the 2020 United States census, there were 4,781 people, 1,438 households, and 889 families residing in the city.

As of the census of 2000, there were 3,012 people, 1,138 households, and 825 families residing in the city. The population density was 1,922.5 people per square mile (740.7/km). There were 1,254 housing units at an average density of 800.4/sq mi (308.4/km). The racial makeup of the city was 78.19% White, 8.50% African American, 0.37% Native American, 0.50% Asian, 0.07% Pacific Islander, 9.26% from other races, and 3.12% from two or more races. Hispanic or Latino of any race were 23.37% of the population.

There were 1,138 households, out of which 40.3% had children under the age of 18 living with them, 58.2% were married couples living together, 9.9% had a female householder with no husband present, and 27.5% were non-families. 22.8% of all households were made up of individuals, and 2.5% had someone living alone who was 65 years of age or older. The average household size was 2.65 and the average family size was 3.13.

In the city, the population was spread out, with 28.8% under the age of 18, 12.8% from 18 to 24, 31.9% from 25 to 44, 20.6% from 45 to 64, and 6.0% who were 65 years of age or older. The median age was 29 years. For every 100 females, there were 99.3 males. For every 100 females age 18 and over, there were 98.6 males.

The median income for a household in the city was $45,000, and the median income for a family was $54,280. Males had a median income of $39,911 versus $22,773 for females. The per capita income for the city was $19,181. About 9.1% of families and 10.5% of the population were below the poverty line, including 13.0% of those under age 18 and 1.7% of those age 65 or over.

Education 

The city is served by the Brazosport Independent School District (BISD).
 Most areas are zoned to Polk Elementary School while some are zoned to Griffith Elementary School (both Pre-K–4).
 Those zoned to Polk and Griffith are zoned to Clute Intermediate School (grades 5–8) and Brazoswood High School (grades 9–12).

Richwood is also served by Brazosport College; the Texas Legislature designated the Brazosport ISD as in the Brazosport College zone.

Additionally it is in the Brazoria County Library System.

References

External links
City of Richwood official website

Cities in Brazoria County, Texas
Cities in Texas
Greater Houston